The men's decathlon at the 1960 Summer Olympics took place between 5 September and 6 September at the Stadio Olimpico.

Analysis

Despite the presence of previous world record holder Vasili Kuznetsov, the competition quickly became a battle between UCLA training partners Rafer Johnson and Yang Chuan-kwang, known as C.K. Yang.  After two years of training together under "Ducky" Drake, each knew the other's abilities.

Yang's abilities lay in the speed events, building an almost 90 point lead in the first two events (100m and long jump).  Johnson was superior in the throwing events. At the end of the first day, Johnson had a 55 point advantage.

The second day began with Yang speeding to a 180 point advantage in the 110 hurdles.  Johnson countered with a 270 point gain in the Discus.  Yang continued to dominate in the pole vault but Johnson set a personal record in the event, minimizing Yang's gain.  Yang followed that by staying close to Johnson in the javelin, leaving the final event, Yang's best event, the 1500m to decide the competition.  Both knew Yang would need to defeat Johnson by 10 seconds to win. Johnson did not break, finishing a mere 1.2 seconds behind Yang to claim the gold medal.  Yang beat Johnson in seven of the ten events, but Johnson beat Yang by significant margins in the shot put and discus to win. The two warmly congratulated each other after the conclusion of the event and waved to the crowd.

Records
Prior to this competition, the existing world and Olympic records were as follows:

Results

100m

Long jump

Shot put

High jump

400m

110m hurdles

Discus throw

Pole vault

Javelin throw

1500m

Final standings

References

External links
Olympic Games Official Report 1960 Rome-Volume I
Olympic Games Official Report 1960 Rome-Volume II

Decathlon
1960
Men's events at the 1960 Summer Olympics